Anorotsangana is a municipality in north-western Madagascar over the Mozambique Channel. It is some 250 kilometres south of Antsiranana. It belongs to the district of Ambanja, which is a part of Diana Region. According to 2001 census the population of Anorotsangana was 5,250.

Only primary schooling is available in town. Farming and raising livestock provides employment for 40% and 21.3% of the working population. The most important crops are coffee and coconut, while other important agricultural products are pepper and rice. Industry and services provide employment for 0.5% and 0.2% of the population, respectively. Additionally fishing employs 38% of the population.

References and notes

Populated places in Diana Region
Populated coastal places in Madagascar